Skylar Kergil is an American transgender activist, singer-songwriter, public speaker, YouTube personality, and artist. Kergil has been documenting his transition from female-to-male on YouTube since 2009 to educate viewers about gender identity, gender affirming procedures, and his life as a trans man. As of April 2016, he has over 100,000 YouTube subscribers and over 9 million views. He began taking testosterone and putting videos on YouTube while attending high school and continued making videos while he was a student at Skidmore College. Kergil currently resides in Somerville, Massachusetts, continuing to create music and art.

Biography 

Growing up, Sky presented himself as a tomboy, though in high school, he tried to change and fit in with the girls, which he said felt fake and uncomfortable. Soon, he started hanging out with his high school's lesbian crowd, cutting his hair and wearing baggy clothes, and playing in a punk rock band. This still was not the right fit for him. It wasn't until meeting a trans woman at a concert when he was 15 that Kergil realized he was transgender. Over the next several years, Kergil met with a gender therapist and started going by the more gender-neutral name Skye. He came out to his parents as a transgender man, and though greeted initially by concern, he was soon met with immense support from them. He started testosterone in early 2009, his senior year of high school. The timing was important for him since he wanted to start at Skidmore College presenting as a man.

At Skidmore, Kergil majored in Art, at first concentrating primarily in painting (with a short dip into ceramics), but later focusing more on photography. Kergil also took several poetry classes, feeling drawn to the subject from his years of writing lyrics for his music. In his junior year, he wrote a particularly touching poem about a hero hen named Hera freeing her fellow hens from a factory farm. Kergil made a strong group of friends over his freshman and second years who he still remains friends with now, including his first year roommate and subsequent excellent friend, Ethan Paul. Over his years at Skidmore, Kergil participated in several clubs, including Skidmore's Japanese Taiko drumming group, SkiDaiko, and the LGBTQ group, Pride Alliance, where he held an executive board position as an upperclassman. Kergil was seen as one of the most genuine human beings on campus, and tended to easily make friends wherever he went. He performed his music at various open mic nights and informal concerts for his friends, always performing with his combination of zeal and grace. His passion for his music was clear, just ahead of his passion for working out and taking selfies.

Kergil started Skidmore without wanting to be "out" to everyone as a trans man. He came out to his friends, but not to the wider community. As his YouTube channel started to grow though, and he began to realize that he was in a position to make a difference in people's lives, he started to discover his passion for activism, and realized that to really make a difference, he needed to start living out to the community. In his senior year at Skidmore, Kergil was asked to speak and play music at several local college events in upstate New York, which really ignited his passion for this kind of activism.

Music
Kergil's first band, Degenerexix, had more punk influences than his more recent music, as can be heard in his song "Animals are Hardcore." As his music tastes changed, he started writing more folk sounding music, playing solo either under his own name, or Lentils and Dirt.

Activism

Publications
Tell Me a Story, 2015. A kickstarted EP.
Thank You, 2014. A kickstarted music album.
Rehumanizing the Trans-masculine Community, 2013. A self-published photographic and narrative look at the lives of several members of the trans-masculine community. Senior art thesis.

References

External links 

Skylar on First Person

Living people
People from Acton, Massachusetts
Transgender artists
Transgender men
LGBT people from Massachusetts
LGBT YouTubers
Skidmore College alumni
LGBT media personalities
Transgender singers
20th-century LGBT people
21st-century LGBT people
Transgender male musicians
Year of birth missing (living people)